Valby may refer to:

 Valby, district in comprising the municipality of Copenhagen, Denmark. 
 Valby (Gribskov Municipality), village in Gribskov Municipality north of Copenhagen, Denmark
 Valby, Oregon, unincorporated community in the U.S. state of Oregon
 John Valby, musician and comedian
 Valby, former village in Taastrup